The 2017 Superclásico de las Américas – Copa Doctor Nicolás Leoz was the fourth edition of the Superclásico de las Américas. The match was played at the Melbourne Cricket Ground in Melbourne, Australia.

Argentina won the match by the solitary goal scored by Gabriel Mercado in the 45th minute of the first half.

Venue

Match details 

|style="vertical-align:top; width:50%"|

|}

References

External links
Brazil vs Argentina on Sky Sports website

Superclásico de las Américas
Argentina national football team matches
Brazil national football team matches
Superclásico de las Américas
Superclásico de las Américas
International association football competitions hosted by Australia
Superclásico de las Américas
Superclásico de las Américas